Bistrets is a village in Krushari Municipality, Dobrich Province, northeastern Bulgaria.

References

Villages in Dobrich Province